Come Visit the Big Bigot (The Big Bigot on the Ink and Volition LP releases) is the sixth full length studio album by Australian experimental group Severed Heads, released in 1986. The tracks "Twenty Deadly Diseases" and "Propellor" were both released as singles to help promote the album. The title is a reference to the Big Merino statue in New South Wales; the 1998 Sevcom CD-R release has a photo of it on the cover.

Track listing
All songs written by Tom Ellard, except "Strange Brew," written by Eric Clapton, Felix Pappalardi and Gail Collins.
Original album

The Volition LP opens with the sound of an experiment Ellard did, in which he stuck a live microphone deep into a watermelon and dropped it from a second-story balcony.  Footage of him doing this appeared on a segment about synthesis on the ABC program Edge of the Wedge.  The words "THE SOUND OF A WATERMELON....!" were etched into the runout groove of Side One.
The Ink and Volition LP releases had "George the Animal" (4:00) in the place of "Twenty Deadly Diseases," and did not credit "FM Stations Blow Up," but had it as the end of "Propellor," for a total length of 6:33. 
The "SAM" in "SAM Loves You" is the early speech synthesis program S.A.M. (Software Automatic Mouth).
The Volition LP included the "Propellor" 12" EP, with "Propellor Two (Rotation Mix)," remixed by Topsy Keevil, and "Propellor Three (Kamikazee Mix)," "Twenty Deadly Diseases (Terminal Mix)," and "Harold and Cindy Hospital (Casualty Mix)," which were remixed by Robert Racic.

This release marked the first time the album used the original digital master tapes.  This resulted in some songs starting and ending at different points from the original release.

This version has "Propellor" and "FM Stations Blow Up" as one track, shifting side 2 to tracks 7-11. 15 is actually the Casualty Mix.

Side 3 is 1-4, Side 4 is 5-8.  This version has a significantly edited (and uncredited) "FM Stations" coda at the end of "Propellor," total time 5:35.

Personnel
Tom Ellard - vocals, bass, keyboards, sound guns
Stephen Jones - video tape, video synthesizers
Oboreta Kyojin - drums, computers
Topsy Keevil - choir, production
Volition Records - cover (Ink and Volition releases)
Steven R. Gilmore - photography, design, artwork (Nettwerk release)
Greg Skyes - artwork, assistance (Nettwerk release)

Release history

References

External links
 
 Severed Heads Bandcamp page

Severed Heads albums
1986 albums